Kowloon West New Dynamic is a district-based pro-Beijing political group in Hong Kong.  It was founded by a group of local politicians in the western part of Kowloon on 16 March 2008.  The main focus of party is to improve quality of life in the districts within the area which including Sham Shui Po District, Kowloon City District, and Yau Tsim Mong District. Priscilla Leung is the current chairman. The party currently holds seven seats in the District Council of Hong Kong and one seat in Legislative Council of Hong Kong.

It played an instrumental role in electing its chairman Priscilla Leung to a seat in Kowloon West in the 2008 Legislative Council election. After Leung joined the pro-business parliamentary group Business and Professionals Alliance for Hong Kong (BPA) in October 2012, the Kowloon West New Dynamic became a subordinate group of the BPA. The group joined the election again in 2021, with Scott Leung elected as the second legislator of the party following the landslide win of pro-Beijing bloc.

Performance in elections

Legislative Council elections

District Council elections

References

Political parties established in 2008
Political parties in Hong Kong
2008 establishments in Hong Kong